Andrew Millar was a male English international table tennis player.

Table tennis career
He won a bronze medal in the 1933 World Table Tennis Championships in the Swaythling Cup (men's team event) with Adrian Haydon, David Jones, Alec Brook and Edward Rimer for England.

See also
 List of England players at the World Team Table Tennis Championships
 List of World Table Tennis Championships medalists

References

English male table tennis players
World Table Tennis Championships medalists